is the 17th single of Japanese rock band Asian Kung-Fu Generation. The single was released on April 11, 2012. It was composed by Masafumi Gotoh and Kensuke Kita. It reached number 8 on the Oricon chart.

Track listing

Personnel
Masafumi Gotō – lead vocals, rhythm guitar
Kensuke Kita – lead guitar, background vocals
Takahiro Yamada –  bass, background vocals
Kiyoshi Ijichi – drums
Asian Kung-Fu Generation – producer

References 

Asian Kung-Fu Generation songs
2012 singles
2012 songs
Ki/oon Music singles